Poc chuc is a Mexican dish of meat, commonly pork, that is prepared in citrus marinade and cooked over a grill. Poc chuc is often served with a side of rice, pickled onion, refried beans, and avocado. Poc chuc is one of the signature dishes of the Yucatán.

Etymology 
The term poc chuc is made up of two Mayan words: poc, which means to toast, especially on hot embers, and chuc, which is charcoal.

References 

Meat dishes
Cuisine of Yucatán
Pork dishes